Allowrie was an electoral district of the Legislative Assembly in the Australian state of New South Wales first created in 1904 and replacing Shoalhaven and part of Moruya. Its name appears to be Aboriginal, meaning "pleasant place near the sea" or "high place near the sea" and may be the source of the name Illawarra. In 1920, with the introduction of proportional representation, it was absorbed into Wollondilly, along with Wollongong.

Members for Allowrie
The seat's inaugural election in 1904 was won by Mark Morton who was the sitting  MP for Shoalhaven. He defeated the sitting  MP for Kiama, Alexander Campbell. Morton went to win the next four elections. He won unopposed in 1907 and defeated 's Charles William Craig twice 1910 and 1913. Prior the 1917 election, Morton became a member of the newly formed Nationalist Party and was returned with a slightly increased majority. The seat was abolished in 1920 and Morton went on to serve as the member for Wollondilly.

See also
 Electoral results for the district of Allowrie

References

Former electoral districts of New South Wales
1904 establishments in Australia
1920 disestablishments in Australia
Constituencies established in 1904
Constituencies disestablished in 1920